The long-billed spiderhunter (Arachnothera robusta) is a species of bird in the family Nectariniidae.
It is found in Brunei, Indonesia, Malaysia, and Thailand.
Its natural habitats are subtropical or tropical moist lowland forests and subtropical or tropical moist montane forests.

References

Arachnothera
Birds of Brunei
Birds of Malaysia
Birds of Malesia
Birds described in 1845
Taxonomy articles created by Polbot